Prosoplus laterialbus is a species of beetle in the family Cerambycidae. It was described by Stephan von Breuning in 1971.

References

Prosoplus
Beetles described in 1971